James Croft (c. 1518–1590) was an English politician.

James Croft may also refer to:

James E. Croft (1833–1914), Union Army soldier and Medal of Honor recipient
James Croft (priest) (1784–1869), Archdeacon of Canterbury
James Croft (died 1624), Member of Parliament for Brackley
Sir James Herbert Croft, 11th Baronet (1907–1941), British army officer

See also
Jamie Croft, Australian actor 
James Scott, 1st Duke of Monmouth (1649–1685), English nobleman, originally called James Crofts
James Crofts (British Army officer)
Croft (surname)